Jane DeDecker (born 30 August 1961) is a sculptor from Iowa. She specializes in bronze work and her pieces often feature family groups or children.

DeDecker was born in Marengo, Iowa on 30 August 1961 and attended the University of Northern Colorado from 1979 to 1982. She initially studied painting but a teacher introduced her to sculpture and she began to study sculpting. She also studied weaving and textiles and travelled to Paris to study at the Goeblins School of Tapestry. After graduating, she was an apprentice to sculptor George Lundeen at his sculpture studio in Loveland, Colorado. She learned the techniques of bronze casting, and after two years became a master craftsman at the studio. She also worked with Robert Zimmerman at his bronze studio where she assisted in the production of bronze monuments. DeDecker has also taught sculpture courses at the Loveland Arts Academy and the Denver Arts Students League.

In 2007 she became a Fellow of the National Sculpture Society, New York, NY. In 2008, she won the C. Percival Dietsch Prize for Sculpture in the Round.

In 2022, DeDecker was named as one of USA Today'''s Women of the Year, which recognizes women who have made a significant impact.

 Selected works 
 Statue of Harriet Tubman (Gainesville, Georgia)
 Statue of Harriet Tubman (Ypsilanti, Michigan)
 Statue of Harriet Tubman (Little Rock, Arkansas)
 Through the Shelter of Love'', Salt Lake City
 Fountain at Cerritos Sculpture Garden, Cerritos, California
 Works in the Dale Nicholson Sculpture Garden, Little Rock, Arkansas

References

1961 births
Living people
People from Marengo, Iowa
University of Northern Colorado alumni
American women sculptors
21st-century American women artists